Jelena Maksimović (Serbian Cyrillic: Јелена Максимовић; born April 20, 1982) is a Serbian professional basketball player, who plays as a center.

During her career, she played for several clubs in Serbia and abroad. She has also appeared for the Serbian national team.

External links
 Profile at eurobasket.com

1982 births
Living people
Basketball players from Belgrade
Serbian expatriate basketball people in Bosnia and Herzegovina
Serbian expatriate basketball people in Spain
Serbian expatriate basketball people in Hungary
Serbian expatriate basketball people in Israel
Serbian expatriate basketball people in Montenegro
Serbian expatriate basketball people in Poland
Serbian expatriate basketball people in Romania
Serbian expatriate basketball people in Slovakia
Serbian expatriate basketball people in Turkey
Serbian women's basketball players
Serbian women's 3x3 basketball players
ŽKK Partizan players
ŽKK Radivoj Korać players
ŽKK Crvena zvezda players
ŽKK Željezničar Sarajevo players
Centers (basketball)